Mumbo may refer to:

The god Mumbo from the African new religious movement Mumboism

Mumbo, a villain from the Teen Titans animated series.
A King of Quendor from the Zork universe.
"Mumbo", a song by Paul McCartney & Wings from the album Wild Life
Mumbo sauce, a condiment

See also 
Mambo (disambiguation)
Mumbo Jumbo (disambiguation)